A variable speed pitch control (or vari-speed) is a control on an audio device such as a turntable, tape recorder, or CD player that allows the operator to deviate from a standard speed (such as 33, 45 or even 78 rpm on a turntable), resulting in adjustments in pitch. The latter term "vari-speed" is more commonly used for tape decks, particularly in the UK. Analog pitch controls vary the voltage being used by the playback device; digital controls use digital signal processing to change the playback speed or pitch. A typical DJ deck allows the pitch to be increased or reduced by up to 8%, which is achieved by increasing or reducing the speed at which the platter rotates. 

Turntable or CD playing speed may be changed for beatmatching and other DJ techniques, while pitch shift using a pitch control has myriad uses in sound recording.

Vari-speed in consumer cassette decks 

Superscope, Inc. of Sun Valley added vari-speed as a feature of portable cassette decks in 1975.  The C-104 and C-105 models incorporated this feature.

Superscope trademarked the name Vari-Speed in 1974.  The trademark category was Computer & Software Products & Electrical & Scientific Products.  The trademark goods and Services use was Magnetic tape recorders and reproducers.  The trademark expired in 1995.

DJ pitch usage 

For DJs the possibility to alter the pitch on their turntables or CD players is standard. On the Technics SL-1200 turntables there both has been the possibility of changing the pitch +/− 8% and models where you could change the pitch +/− 16%. This has become the standard amongst DJs and most software that emulates a DJ setup have their pitch control often standard at +/− 8%. With the possibility to change it to +/− 16% and some other values. By changing the pitch the DJ can alter the BPM of a record within this limited range. This is a key component for beatmatching, enabling the DJ to get two records to play at the same BPM thereby synchronising the beat for the dancers.

Reset button 
On Technics SL-1200 turntables, pressing the Reset button returns the pitch to a fixed preset value of +/−0% regardless of the pitch control position.

See also
 Audio time stretching and pitch scaling
 Beatmatching

References

External links
Pitch Control

Audio engineering
DJ equipment
DJing
Hip hop production
Sound recording